Southern American English or Southern U.S. English is a regional dialect or collection of dialects of American English spoken throughout the Southern United States, though concentrated increasingly in more rural areas, and spoken primarily by White Southerners. In terms of accent, its most innovative forms include southern varieties of Appalachian English and certain varieties of Texan English. Popularly known in the United States as a Southern accent or simply Southern, Southern American English now comprises the largest American regional accent group by number of speakers. Formal, much more recent terms within American linguistics include Southern White Vernacular English and Rural White Southern English.

History and geography
A diversity of earlier Southern dialects once existed: a consequence of the mix of English speakers from the British Isles (including largely Southern English and Scots-Irish immigrants) who migrated to the American South in the 17th and 18th centuries, with particular 19th-century elements also borrowed from the London upper class and African-American slaves. By the 19th century, this included distinct dialects in eastern Virginia, the greater lowcountry area surrounding Charleston, the Appalachian upcountry region, the Black Belt plantation region, and secluded Atlantic coastal and island communities.

Following the American Civil War, as the South's economy and migration patterns fundamentally transformed, so did Southern dialect trends. Over the next few decades, Southerners moved increasingly to Appalachian mill towns, to Texan farms, or out of the South entirely. The main result, further intensified by later upheavals such as the Great Depression, the Dust Bowl and perhaps World War II, is that a newer and more unified form of Southern American English consolidated, beginning around the last quarter of the 19th century, radiating outward from Texas and Appalachia through all the traditional Southern States until around World War II. This newer Southern dialect largely superseded the older and more diverse local Southern dialects, though it became quickly stigmatized in American popular culture. As a result, since around 1950, the notable features of this newer Southern accent have been in a gradual decline, particularly among younger and more urban Southerners, though less so among rural white Southerners. 

Despite the slow decline of the modern Southern accent, it is still documented as widespread as of the 2006 Atlas of North American English. Specifically, the Atlas definitively documents a Southern accent in Virginia, North Carolina, South Carolina (though not Charleston), Georgia (though Atlanta is inconsistent), Alabama, Mississippi, Tennessee, Kentucky, Arkansas, and Louisiana (co-occurring with Cajun and New Orleans accents), as well as almost all of Texas, southern West Virginia, the Springfield area of Missouri, Southern Maryland and the lower Eastern Shore of Maryland, the Jacksonville area of Florida, and southeastern New Mexico. A South Midland accent is documented by the Atlas as sharing key features with the Southern accent, though to a weaker extent; such features encompass the whole of Texas, Oklahoma, West Virginia, eastern and central Kansas, southern Missouri, southern Indiana, southern Ohio, and possibly southern Illinois. African-American accents across the United States have many common points with Southern accents due to the strong historical ties of African Americans to the South.

Social perceptions
In the United States, there is a general negative stigma surrounding the Southern dialect. Non-Southern Americans tend to associate a Southern accent with lower social and economic class, cognitive and verbal slowness, lack of education, ignorance, bigotry, or religious or political conservatism, using common labels like "hick", "hillbilly", or "redneck" accent. Meanwhile, Southerners themselves tend to have mixed judgments of their own accent, some similarly negative but others positively associating it with a laid-back, plain, or humble attitude. The accent is also associated nationwide with the military, NASCAR, and country music. Furthermore, non-Southern American country singers typically imitate a Southern accent in their music. The sum negative associations nationwide, however, are the main presumable cause of a gradual decline of Southern accent features, since the middle of the 20th century onwards, particularly among younger and more urban residents of the South.

Modern phonology

Most of the Southern United States underwent several major sound changes from the beginning to the middle of the 20th century, during which a more unified, region-wide sound system developed, markedly different from the sound systems of the 19th-century Southern dialects.

The South as a present-day dialect region generally includes all of these pronunciation features below, which are popularly recognized in the United States as a "Southern accent". However, there is still variation in Southern speech regarding potential differences based on factors like a speaker's exact sub-region, age, ethnicity, etc. The following phonological phenomena focus on the developing sound system of the 20th-century Southern dialects of the United States that altogether largely (though certainly not entirely) superseded the older Southern regional patterns:
Southern Vowel Shift (or Southern Shift): A chain shift regarding vowels is fully completed, or occurring, in most Southern dialects, especially 20th-century ones, and at the most advanced stage in the "Inland South" (i.e. away from the Gulf and Atlantic Coasts) as well as much of central and northern Texas. This 3-stage chain movement of vowels is first triggered by Stage 1 that dominates the entire Southern region, followed by Stage 2 that covers almost all of that area, and Stage 3 that is concentrated only in speakers of the two aforementioned core sub-regions.
Stage 1 ( → ): 
The starting point, or first stage, of the Southern Shift is the transition of the diphthong  towards a "glideless" long vowel , so that, for example, the word ride commonly approaches a sound that most other American English speakers would hear as rod or rad. Stage 1 is now complete for a majority of Southern dialects. Some traditional East Coast Southern accents do not exhibit this Stage 1 glide deletion, particularly in Charleston, South Carolina, as well as Atlanta and Savannah, Georgia (cities that are, at best, considered marginal to the modern Southern dialect region). 
An example is that, to other English speakers, the Southern pronunciation of yap sounds something like yeah-up. See "Southern vowel breaking" below for more information.
Stage 2 ( →  and  → ): 
An example is that, to other English speakers, the Southern pronunciation of yep sounds something like yay-up. Stage 2 is most common in heavily stressed syllables. Southern accents originating from cities that formerly had the greatest influence and wealth in the South (Richmond, Virginia; Charleston, South Carolina; Atlanta, Macon, and Savannah, Georgia; and all of Florida) do not traditionally participate in Stage 2.
An example is that, to other English speakers, the Southern pronunciation of fin sounds something like fee-in, while meat sounds something like mih-eet. Like the other stages of the Southern shift, Stage 3 is most common in heavily stressed syllables and particularly among Inland Southern speakers.
Southern vowel breaking ("Southern drawl"): All three stages of the Southern Shift appear related to the short front pure vowels being "broken" into gliding vowels, making one-syllable words like pet and pit sound as if they might have two syllables (as something like pay-it and pee-it). This short front vowel gliding phenomenon is popularly recognized as the "Southern drawl". Appearing mostly after the mid-19th century, this phenomenon is on the decline, being most typical of Southern speakers born before 1960.
This is common in vernacular English dialects around the world.
In much of the South during the 1900s, there was a trend to lower the vowel found in words like stalk and caught, often with an upglide, so that the most common result today is the gliding vowel . However, the cot–caught merger is becoming increasingly common throughout the United States, thus affecting Southeastern and even some Southern dialects, towards a merged vowel . In the South, this merger, or a transition towards this merger, is especially documented in central, northern, and (particularly) western Texas.

Pin-pen merger: the vowels  and  now merge when before nasal consonants, so that pen and pin, for instance, or hem and him, are pronounced the same, as pin or him, respectively. The merger, towards the sound , is still unreported among some vestigial varieties of the older South, and other geographically Southern U.S. varieties that have eluded the Southern Vowel Shift, such as the Yat dialect of New Orleans or the anomalous dialect of Savannah, Georgia. 
Rhoticity: The "dropping" of the r sound after vowels was historically widespread in the South, particularly in former plantation areas. This phenomenon, non-rhoticity, was considered prestigious before World War II, after which the social perception in the South reversed. Now, full or variable rhoticity (sometimes called r-fulness), in which most or all r sounds are pronounced, is dominant throughout most of the South, and even "hyper-rhoticity", particularly among younger and female white Southerners. The only major exceptions are among African American Southerners, whose modern vernacular dialect continues to be mostly non-rhotic, and among some speakers of south Louisiana and Cajun accents, which tend to be non-rhotic. The sound quality of the Southern r is the distinctive "bunch-tongued r", produced by strongly constricting the root or midsection of the tongue, or both.
 Pronunciation of ⟨wh⟩: Most of the U.S. has completed the wine–whine merger, but, in many Southern accents, particularly inland Southern accents, the phonemes  and  remain distinct, so that pairs of words like wail and whale or wield and wheeled are not homophones.
 Lax and tense vowels often neutralize before , making pairs like feel/fill and fail/fell homophones for speakers in some areas of the South. Some speakers may distinguish between the two sets of words by reversing the normal vowel sound, e.g., feel in Southern may sound like fill, and vice versa.
  becomes  before , for example  wasn't,  business, but hasn't may keep the [z] to avoid merging with hadn't.
 Many nouns are stressed on the first syllable that are stressed on the second syllable in most other American accents. These may include police, cement, Detroit, Thanksgiving, insurance, behind, display, hotel, motel, recycle, TV, guitar, July, and umbrella. Today, younger Southerners tend to keep this initial stress for a more reduced set of words, perhaps including only insurance, defense, Thanksgiving, and umbrella.
Phonemic incidence is sometimes unique in the South, so that:
Florida is typically pronounced  rather than General American , and lawyer is  rather than General American  (i.e., the first syllable of lawyer sounds like law, not loy).
The  in words like Monday and Sunday is commonly .
Spigot (a water tap) is often pronounced , as if spelled spicket.
 Lacking or incomplete happy tensing: The tensing of unstressed, word-final  (the second vowel sound in words like happy, money, Chelsea, etc.) to a higher and fronter vowel like  is typical throughout the United States, except in the South.

Inland South and Texas

William Labov et al. identify the "Inland South" as a large linguistic sub-region of the South located mostly in southern Appalachia (specifically naming the cities of Greenville, South Carolina, Asheville, North Carolina, Knoxville and Chattanooga, Tennessee, and Birmingham and Linden, Alabama), inland from both the Gulf and Atlantic Coasts, and the originating region of the Southern Vowel Shift. The Inland South, along with the "Texas South" (an urban core of central Texas: Dallas, Lubbock, Odessa, and San Antonio) are considered the two major locations in which the Southern regional sound system is the most highly developed, and therefore the core areas of the current-day South as a dialect region.

The accents of Texas are actually diverse, for example with important Spanish influences on its vocabulary; however, much of the state is still an unambiguous region of modern rhotic Southern speech, strongest in the cities of Dallas, Lubbock, Odessa, and San Antonio, which all firmly demonstrate the first stage of the Southern Shift, if not also further stages of the shift. Texan cities that are noticeably "non-Southern" dialectally are Abilene and Austin; only marginally Southern are Houston, El Paso, and Corpus Christi. In western and northern Texas, the cot–caught merger is very close to completed.

Distinct phonologies
Some sub-regions of the South, and perhaps even a majority of the biggest cities, are showing a gradual shift away from the Southern accent (toward a more Midland or General American accent) since the second half of the 20th century to the present. Such well-studied cities include Houston, Texas, and Raleigh, North Carolina; in Raleigh, for example, this retreat from the accent appears to have begun around 1950. Other sub-regions are unique in that their inhabitants have never spoken with the Southern regional accent, instead having their own distinct accents.

Atlanta, Charleston, and Savannah
The Atlas of North American English identified Atlanta, Georgia, as a dialectal "island of non-Southern speech", Charleston, South Carolina, likewise as "not markedly Southern in character", and the traditional local accent of Savannah, Georgia, as "giving way to regional [Midland] patterns", despite these being three prominent Southern cities. The dialect features of Atlanta are best described today as sporadic from speaker to speaker, with such variation increased due to a huge movement of non-Southerners into the area during the 1990s. Modern-day Charleston speakers have leveled in the direction of a more generalized Midland accent (and speakers in other Southern cities too like Greenville, Richmond, and Norfolk), away from the city's now-defunct, traditional Charleston accent, whose features were "diametrically opposed to the Southern Shift... and differ in many other respects from the main body of Southern dialects". The Savannah accent is also becoming more Midland-like. The following vowel sounds of Atlanta, Charleston, and Savannah have been unaffected by typical Southern phenomena like the Southern drawl and Southern Vowel Shift: 
 as in bide (however, some Atlanta and Savannah speakers do variably show Southern  glide weakening).
 as in bait.
 as in bed.
 as in bid.
 as in bead.
 as in bought (which is lowered, as in most of the U.S., and approaches ; the cot–caught merger is mostly at a transitional stage in these cities).
Today, the accents of Atlanta, Charleston, and Savannah are most similar to Midland regional accents or at least Southeastern super-regional accents. Non-rhoticity (r-dropping) is now rare in these cities, yet still documented in some speakers.

Southern Louisiana

Most of southern Louisiana constitutes Acadiana, a cultural region dominated for hundreds of years by monolingual speakers of Cajun French, which combines elements of Acadian French with other French and Spanish words. Today, this French dialect is spoken by many older Cajun ethnic group and is said to be dying out. A related language, Louisiana Creole French, also exists. Since the early 1900s, Cajuns additionally began to develop their own vernacular dialect of English, which retains some influences and words from French, such as "cher" (dear) or "nonc" (uncle). This dialect fell out of fashion after World War II, but experienced a renewal in primarily male speakers born since the 1970s, who have been the most attracted by, and the biggest attractors for, a successful Cajun cultural renaissance. The accent includes:
 variable non-rhoticity (or r-dropping), high nasalization (including in vowels before nasal consonants)
 deletion of any word's final consonant(s) (hand becomes , food becomes , rent becomes , New York becomes , etc.)
 the cot–caught merger towards 

A separate historical English dialect from the above Cajun one, spoken only by those raised in the Greater New Orleans area, is traditionally non-rhotic and noticeably shares more pronunciation commonalities with a New York accent than with other Southern accents, due to commercial ties and cultural migration between the two cities. Since at least the 1980s, this local New Orleans dialect has popularly been called "Yat", from the common local greeting "Where you at?". The New York accent features shared with the Yat accent include: non-rhoticity, a short-a split system (so that bad and back, for example, have different vowels),  as high gliding ,  as rounded , and the coil–curl merger (traditionally, though now in decline). Yat also lacks the typical vowel changes of the Southern Shift and the pin–pen merger that are commonly heard elsewhere throughout the South. Yat is associated with the working and lower-middle classes, though a spectrum with fewer notable Yat features is often heard the higher one's socioeconomic status; such New Orleans affluence is associated with the New Orleans Uptown and the Garden District, whose speech patterns are sometimes considered distinct from the lower-class Yat dialect.

Older phonologies

Prior to becoming a phonologically unified dialect region, the South was once home to an array of much more diverse accents at the local level. Features of the deeper interior Appalachian South largely became the basis for the newer Southern regional dialect; thus, older Southern American English primarily refers to the English spoken outside of Appalachia: the coastal and former plantation areas of the South, best documented before the Civil War, on the decline during the early 1900s, and basically non-existent in speakers born since the civil rights movement.

Little unified these older Southern dialects, since they never formed a single homogeneous dialect region to begin with. Some older Southern accents were rhotic (most strongly in Appalachia and west of the Mississippi), while the majority were non-rhotic (most strongly in plantation areas); however, wide variation existed. Some older Southern accents showed (or approximated) Stage 1 of the Southern Vowel Shift—namely, the glide weakening of —however, it is virtually unreported before the very late 1800s. In general, the older Southern dialects clearly lacked the Mary–marry–merry, cot–caught, horse–hoarse, wine–whine, full–fool, fill–feel, and do–dew mergers, all of which are now common to, or encroaching on, all varieties of present-day Southern American English. Older Southern sound systems included those local to the:
Plantation South (excluding the Lowcountry): phonologically characterized by  glide weakening, non-rhoticity (for some accents, including a coil–curl merger), and the Southern trap–bath split (a version of the trap–bath split unique to older Southern U.S. speech that causes words like lass  not to rhyme with words like pass ).
Eastern and central Virginia (often identified as the "Tidewater accent"): further characterized by Canadian raising and some vestigial resistance to the vein–vain merger.
It is the only dialect of the older South still extant on the East Coast, due to being passed on through generations of geographically isolated islanders.
Appalachian and Ozark Mountains: characterized by strong rhoticity and a tor–tore–tour merger (which still exist in that region), the Southern trap–bath split, plus the original and most advanced instances of the Southern Vowel Shift now defining the whole South.

Grammar
These grammatical features are characteristic of both older and newer Southern American English.

 Use of done as an auxiliary verb between the subject and verb in sentences conveying the past tense.
I done told you before.
 Use of done (instead of did) as the past simple form of do, and similar uses of the past participle in place of the past simple, such as seen replacing saw as past simple form of see.
I only done what you done told me.
I seen her first.
 Use of other non-standard preterites, Such as drownded as the past tense of drown, knowed as past tense of know, choosed as the past tense of choose, degradated as the past tense of degrade.
I knowed you for a fool soon as I seen you.
 Use of was in place of were, or other words regularizing the past tense of be to was.
You was sittin' on that chair.
 Use of been instead of have been in perfect constructions.
I been livin' here darn near my whole life.
 Use of (a-)fixin' to, with several spelling variants such as fixing to or fixinta, to indicate immediate future action; in other words: intending to, preparing to, or about to.
He's fixin' to eat.
They're fixing to go for a hike.
It is not clear where the term comes from and when it was first used. According to dialect dictionaries, fixin' to is associated with Southern speech, most often defined as being a synonym of preparing to or intending to. Some linguists, e.g. Marvin K. Ching, regard it as being a quasimodal rather than a verb followed by an infinitive. It is a term used by all social groups, although more frequently by people with a lower social status than by members of the educated upper classes. Furthermore, it is more common in the speech of younger people than in that of older people. Like much of the Southern dialect, the term is also more prevalent in rural areas than in urban areas.
 Preservation of older English me, him, etc. as reflexive datives.
I'm fixin' to paint me a picture.
He's gonna catch him a big one.
 Saying this here in place of this or this one, and that there in place of that or that one.
This here's mine and that there is yours.
 Existential it, a feature dating from Middle English which can be explained as substituting it for there when there refers to no physical location, but only to the existence of something.
It's one lady who lives in town.
It is nothing more to say.
Standard English would prefer "existential there", as in "There's one lady who lives in town". This construction is used to say that something exists (rather than saying where it is located). The construction can be found in Middle English as in Marlowe's Edward II: "Cousin, it is no dealing with him now".
 Use of ever in place of every.
Ever'where's the same these days.
Using liketa (sometimes spelled as liked to or like to) to mean "almost".
I liketa died.
He liketa got hit by a car.
Liketa is presumably a conjunction of "like to" or "like to have" coming from Appalachian English. It is most often seen as a synonym of almost. Accordingly, the phrase I like't'a died would be I almost died in Standard English. With this meaning, liketa can be seen as a verb modifier for actions that are on the verge of happening. Furthermore, it is more often used in an exaggerative or violent figurative sense rather than literal sense.<ref>"Liketa". Yale Grammatical Diversity Project. Yale University. 2019.</ref>
Use of the distal demonstrative "yonder," archaic in most dialects of English, to indicate a third, larger degree of distance beyond both "here" and "there" (thus relegating "there" to a medial demonstrative as in some other languages), indicating that something is a longer way away, and to a lesser extent, in a wide or loosely defined expanse, as in the church hymn "When the Roll Is Called Up Yonder". A typical example is the use "over yonder" in place of "over there" or "in or at that indicated place", especially to refer to a particularly different spot, such as in "the house over yonder".
 Compared to General American English, when contracting a negated auxiliary verb, Southern American English has increased preference for contracting the subject and the auxiliary than the auxiliary and "not", e.g. the first of the following pairs:He's not here. / He isn't here.I've not been there. / I haven't been there.
Multiple modals
Standard English has a strict word order. In the case of modal auxiliaries, standard English is restricted to a single modal per verb phrase. However, some Southern speakers use double or more modals in a row (might could, might should, might would, used to could, etc.--also called "modal stacking") and sometimes even triple modals that involve oughta (like might should oughta)
I might could climb to the top.
I used to could do that. 
The origin of multiple modals is controversial; some say it is a development of Modern English, while others trace them back to Middle English and again others to Scots-Irish settlers. There are different opinions on which class preferably uses the term.  for example, finds that educated people try to avoid multiple modals, whereas  suggests the opposite. In some Southern regions, multiple modals are quite widespread and not particularly stigmatized. Possible multiple modals are:

	
As the table shows, there are only possible combinations of an epistemic modal followed by deontic modals in multiple modal constructions. Deontic modals express permissibility with a range from obligated to forbidden and are mostly used as markers of politeness in requests whereas epistemic modals refer to probabilities from certain to impossible. Multiple modals combine these two modalities.

Conditional syntax and evidentiality
People from the South often make use of conditional or evidential syntaxes as shown below (italicized in the examples):

Conditional syntax in requests:I guess you could step out and git some toothpicks and a carton of Camel cigarettes, if you a mind to.If you be good enough to take it, I believe I could stand me a taste.

Conditional syntax in suggestions:
I wouldn't look for 'em to show up if I was you.I'd think that whiskey would be a trifle hot.
Conditional syntax creates a distance between the speaker's claim and the hearer. It serves to soften obligations or suggestions, make criticisms less personal, and to overall express politeness, respect, or courtesy.

Southerners also often use "evidential" predicates such as think, reckon, believe, guess, have the feeling, etc.:
You already said that once, I believe.I wouldn't want to guess, but I have the feeling we'll know soon enough.You reckon we oughta get help?
I don't believe I've ever known one.

Evidential predicates indicate an uncertainty of the knowledge asserted in the sentence. They protect speakers from the social embarrassment that appears, in case the assertion turns out to be wrong. As is the case with conditional syntax, evidential predicates can also be used to soften criticisms and to afford courtesy or respect.

Vocabulary
In the United States, the following vocabulary is mostly unique to, or best associated with, Southern U.S. English:Ain't to mean am not, is not, are not, have not, has not, etc.Bless your heart to express sympathy or concern to the addressee; often, now used ironicallyBuggy to mean shopping cartCarry to additionally mean escort or accompanyCatty-corner to mean located or placed diagonallyChill bumps as a synonym for goose bumpsCoke to mean any sweet, carbonated soft drinkCrawfish to mean crayfishCut on/off/out to mean turn on/off/outDevil's beating his wife to describe the weather phenomenon of a sunshowerFixin' to to mean about to Icing (preferred over frosting in the confectionary sense)Liketa to mean almost or nearly (in Alabama and Appalachian English)Ordinary to mean disreputableOrnery to mean bad-tempered or surly (derived from ordinary)Powerful to mean great in number or amount (used as an adverb)Right to mean very or extremely (used as an adverb)Reckon to mean think, guess, or concludeRolling to mean the prank of toilet paperingSlaw as a synonym for coleslawTaters to mean potatoesToboggan to mean knit capTote to mean carryTump to mean tip or turn over as an intransitive verb (in the western South, including Texas and Louisiana)Ugly to mean rudeVarmint to mean vermin or an undesirable animal or personVeranda to mean large, roofed porchYonder to mean over thereUnique words can occur as Southern nonstandard past-tense forms of verbs, particularly in the Southern highlands and Piney Woods, as in yesterday they riz up, come outside, drawed, and drownded, as well as participle forms like they have took it, rode it, blowed it up, and swimmed away. Drug is traditionally both the past tense and participle form of the verb drag.

Y'all
 Y'all is a second person plural pronoun and the usual Southern plural form of the word you. It is originally a contractionyou allwhich is used less frequently. This term popularized with the modern Southern dialect and was only rarely used in older Southern dialects.
 When addressing a group, y'all is general (I know y'all) and is used to address the group as a whole, whereas all y'all is used to emphasize specificity of each and every member of the group ("I know all y'all.") The possessive form of Y'all is created by adding the standard "-'s".
"I've got y'all's assignments here." 
 Y'all is distinctly separate from the singular you. The statement "I gave y'all my truck payment last week," is more precise than "I gave you my truck payment last week." You (if interpreted as singular) could imply the payment was given directly to the person being spoken towhen that may not be the case.
 "All y'all" is used to specify that all members of the second person plural (i.e., all persons currently being addressed and/or all members of a group represented by an addressee) are included; that is, it operates in contradistinction to "some of y'all", thereby functioning similarly to "all of you" in standard English.
 In rural southern Appalachia an "n" is added to pronouns indicating "one" "his'n" "his one" "her'n" "her one" "Yor'n" "your one" i.e. "his, hers and yours". Another example is yernses. It may be substituted for the 2nd person plural possessive yours."That book is yernses." 

Southern Louisiana

Southern Louisiana English especially is known for some unique vocabulary: long sandwiches are often called poor boys or po' boys, woodlice/roly-polies called doodle bugs, the end of a bread loaf called a nose, pedestrian islands and median strips alike called neutral ground, and sidewalks called banquettes.

Relationship to African-American English

Discussion of "Southern dialect" in the United States popularly refers to those English varieties spoken by white Southerners; however, as a geographic term, it may also encompass the dialects developed among other social or ethnic groups in the South, most prominently including African Americans. Today, African-American Vernacular English (AAVE) is a fairly unified variety of English spoken by working- and middle-class African Americans throughout the United States. AAVE exhibits an evident relationship with both older and newer Southern dialects, though the exact nature of this relationship is poorly understood. It is clear that AAVE was influenced by older speech patterns of the Southern United States, where Africans and African Americans were held as slaves until the American Civil War. These slaves originally spoke a diversity of indigenous African languages but picked up English to communicate with one another, their white masters, and the white servants and laborers they often closely worked alongside. Many features of AAVE suggest that it largely developed from nonstandard dialects of colonial English (with some features of AAVE absent from other modern American dialects, yet still existing in certain modern British dialects). However, there is also evidence of the influence of West African languages on AAE vocabulary and grammar.

It is uncertain to what extent early white Southern English borrowed elements from early African-American Vernacular English versus the other way around. Like many white accents of English once spoken in Southern plantation areas—namely, the Lowcountry, Virginia Piedmont and Tidewater and lower Mississippi Valley—the modern-day AAVE accent is mostly non-rhotic (or "r-dropping" ). The presence of non-rhoticity in both black English and older white Southern English is not merely coincidence, though, again, which dialect influenced which is unknown. It is better documented, however, that white Southerners borrowed some morphological processes from black Southerners.

Many grammatical features were used alike by older speakers of white Southern English and African-American Vernacular English more so than by contemporary speakers of the same two varieties. Even so, contemporary speakers of both continue to share these unique grammatical features: "existential it", the word y'all, double negatives, was to mean were, deletion of had and have, them to mean those, the term fixin' to, stressing the first syllable of words like hotel or guitar'', and many others. However, while this glide weakening has triggered among white Southerners a complicated "Southern Vowel Shift", black speakers in the South and elsewhere on the other hand are "not participating or barely participating" in much of this shift.

One strong possibility for the divergence of black American English and white Southern American English (i.e., the disappearance of older Southern American English) is that the civil rights struggles caused these two racial groups "to stigmatize linguistic variables associated with the other group". This may explain some of the differences outlined above, including why most traditionally non-rhotic white Southern accents have shifted to now becoming intensely rhotic.

See also
 Accent perception
 African-American English
 Appalachian English
 Drawl
 High Tider
 Regional vocabularies of American English
 Southern literature
 Texan English

References

Sources

External links

American English
African-American English
Culture of the Southern United States
Vowel shifts